This is a list of symbols of Scientology, the Church of Scientology, and related organizations.

List

Trademarks
All official symbols of Scientology are trademarks held by the Religious Technology Center (RTC). They are said by the center to be used "on Scientology religious materials to signify their authenticity ... and provide a legal mechanism to ensure the spiritual technologies are orthodox and ministered according to Mr. Hubbard's Scripture. These marks also provide the means to prevent anyone from engaging in some distorted use of Mr. Hubbard's writings, thereby ensuring the purity of the religion for all eternity."

References

External links 
 
 
 



Scientology
Religious symbols
Scientology beliefs and practices
Religion-related lists